The diamond hoax of 1872 was a swindle in which a pair of prospectors sold a false American diamond deposit to prominent businessmen in San Francisco and New York City.  It also triggered a brief diamond prospecting craze in the western United States, in Arizona, New Mexico, Utah, Wyoming, and Colorado.

History

In 1871, veteran prospectors and cousins Philip Arnold and John Slack traveled to San Francisco. They reported a diamond mine and produced a bag full of diamonds. They stored the diamonds in the vault of the Bank of California, founded by William Chapman Ralston.

Prominent financiers convinced the "reluctant" Arnold and Slack to speak out on their find. The cousins offered to lead investigators to their field. Investors hired a mining engineer to examine the field. They planted their diamonds on a remote location in northwest Colorado Territory.  They then led the investors west from St. Louis, Missouri in June 1872.  Arriving by train at the town of Rawlins, in the Wyoming Territory, they continued on horseback. But Arnold and Slack wanted to keep the exact location a secret, so they led the group on a confusing four-day journey through the countryside. The group finally reached a huge field with various gems on the ground. Tiffany's evaluated the stones as being worth $150,000.

When the engineer made his report, more businessmen expressed interest. They included banker Ralston, General George S. Dodge, Horace Greeley, Asbury Harpending, George McClellan, Baron von Rothschild, and Charles Tiffany of Tiffany and Co. The investors convinced the cousins to sell their interest for $660,000 ($ million today) and formed the San Francisco and New York Mining and Commercial Company. They selected New York attorney Samuel Latham Mitchill Barlow as legal representative. Barlow convinced them to add U.S. Congressman Benjamin F. Butler to the legal staff. Barlow set up a New York corporation known as the Golconda Mining Company with capital stock of $10,000,000, while Butler was given one thousand shares for amending the General Mining Act of 1872 to include the terms “valuable mineral deposits” in order to allow legal mining claims in the diamond fields. The U.S. Attorney General, George H. Williams issued an opinion on August 31, 1872, specifically stating that the terms “valuable mineral deposits” included diamonds.

Financiers sent mining engineer Henry Janin, who bought stock in the company, to evaluate the find. Arnold and Slack led him and a group of investors to just north of what is now called Diamond Peak in the remote northwest corner of the Colorado Territory, where Janin and the investors found enough diamonds in the soil to satisfy themselves. Janin submitted a highly optimistic report, which found its way into the press.

Geologist Clarence King who had led a survey team that recently completed a Geological Exploration of the Fortieth Parallel had a chance meeting with Janin on a train. King and his team were alarmed at the reports of such an prominent diamond field which their survey had not noted. King sent geologist Samuel Franklin Emmons and cartographer A. D. Wilson ahead to investigate, with King joining them soon after. Upon locating the site, they quickly concluded that it had been salted (as a geologist, King was aware that the various stones formed under different conditions and would never be found together in a single deposit), and notified investors.

Further investigation showed Arnold and Slack bought cheap cast-off diamonds, refuse of gem cutting, in London and Amsterdam for $35,000 and scattered them to "salt" the ground. Most of the gems were originally from South Africa.

Arnold returned to his home in Elizabethtown, Kentucky, and became a successful businessman and banker. Diamond-company investors sued him, and he settled the cases for an undisclosed sum. Years later he died of pneumonia after he was wounded in a shootout with a rival banker.

John Slack dropped from public view. He moved to St. Louis, where he owned a casket-making company. He later became a casket maker and undertaker in White Oaks, New Mexico, where he lived quietly and died in 1896 at the age of 76.

Dramatizations
The story of the great hoax was featured in several television programs in the 1950s and 1960s. Marc Hamilton played investor Asbury Harpending (a colorful character known for numerous escapades) in the 1955 episode "A Killing in Diamonds" of the syndicated western television series Death Valley Days. Vaughn Taylor played Harpending in a 1965 episode of the same series, "Raid on the San Francisco Mint," which was hosted by Ronald Reagan, who was cast in the starring role of banker William Chapman Ralston. Death Valley Days aired a third story devoted to the hoax, the 1968 episode "The Great Diamond Mines", with Philip Arnold played by Gavin MacLeod, John Slack by John Fiedler and Ralston by Tod Andrews.

A first-season episode of Maverick (January 1958), "Diamond in the Rough", was based on the hoax.

The incident was also dramatized as "The Great Diamond Mountain" on the television series The Great Adventure in 1963. Arnold was played by John Fiedler, Slack by John McGiver, Ralston by Barry Sullivan, and con-breaking geologist Clarence King by J. D. Cannon.

A mystery, The Dangerous Angel Affair by Clarence Budington Kelland, revolves around the hoax.

Footnotes

See also
 Caleb Lyon, Idaho governor who also started a diamond hoax.

References
 Robert Greene and Joost Elffers, The 48 Laws of Power  (references this scam in Law 21 Play a Sucker to catch a Sucker - Seem Dumber than your Mark) 
 King, Clarence. 1872. Copy of official letter, addressed November 11, 1872, to the Board of Directors of the San Francisco and New York Mining and Commercial Company ... discovering the new diamond fields to be a fraud." San Francisco and New York Mining and Commercial Company. [San Francisco? 1872]. 12 pages. 24 cm. USGS Library.
 Dan Plazak, A Hole in the Ground with a Liar at the Top  (contains a chapter on the great diamond hoax)

External links
 Photographs relating to the great diamond hoax

1872 in the United States
Fraud in the United States
Crimes in California
Diamond